The Dhai Ghar (also written as Dhaighar) Khatris originally consisted of three family groups of North India – Kapoor (or Kapur), Khanna and Malhotra (or its alternatives, Mehra, Mehrotra, Mahara).

To quote Sudhir Kakar

The Khatris were divided into sub-castes. The highest was the Dhai ghar (i.e Two and a half houses – the number three being considered unlucky) grouping, comprising families carrying the surnames of Malhotra, Khanna and Kapur/Kapoor.

References 

Punjabi tribes
Social groups of Delhi
Social groups of Uttar Pradesh
Social groups of Rajasthan
Social groups of Haryana
Social groups of Punjab, India